Ulugbek Ibragimov (born 26 March 1975) is a retired male boxer from Uzbekistan. He represented his native country at the 1996 Summer Olympics in Atlanta, Georgia, where he was defeated by Germany's Falk Huste in the second round of the men's featherweight division (– 57 kg).

References
sports-reference

1975 births
Living people
Featherweight boxers
Boxers at the 1996 Summer Olympics
Olympic boxers of Uzbekistan
Uzbekistani male boxers
20th-century Uzbekistani people
21st-century Uzbekistani people